Lilla Vincze (born 5 June 1961) is a Hungarian singer and songwriter, best known as the singer for pop band Napoleon Boulevard.

Life 
Vincze was born on 5 June 1961 in Siófok, Hungary. Her career began in 1986 with her joining the band Napoleon Boulevard when they won the Interpop Festival. She was initially in the band until 1990, after which she worked with István Cziglán. In the mid-2000s she started to write songs with a crossover style, and in 2008, she released the album Angyalnak, madárnak. In 2009, Napoleon Boulevard reunited.

Since 2000, Vincze has been teaching her own vocal class and has a teaching degree. She has also participated in several theatrical productions, playing Édith Piaf on the stage of the Éva Ruttkai Theatre. She gives church concerts, plays with chamber orchestra and works with the Rajkó Orchestra. In 2017, she appeared on A nagy duett, partnered with Bence Apáti.

On 3 December 2018, it was revealed that Vincze would be a judge on A Dal 2019, the 2019 edition of the national selection process for the Eurovision Song Contest 2019, to be held in Tel Aviv, Israel. She previously was a jury member for the Hungarian jury vote for the Eurovision Song Contest 2018.

Awards 
 Interpop Festival 1st place (1986)
 Pop-Meccs - Singer of the year (1986, 1987, 1988, 1989, 1990)
 EMeRTon award (1988)
 Transilvanian Music Awards - Special award (2013)

Discography

Solo albums 
 Lilla (1989)
 Lilla és Czigi (1990)
 Mámor (1992)
 Szállj velem - koncert (1993)
 Két Hold (1994)
 Mély kék (1997)
 Titanic (1999)
 Angyalnak, madárnak (2008)

Napoleon Boulevard (band) 
 I. (1986)
 II. (1987)
 Júlia nem akar a földön járni (1988)
 Mennyből az angyal (1989)
 Best of 1985–1989 (2009)
 Világfalu (2010)

Participation

Theatre roles 
The number of roles in the Theatrical Records: 2.

References

External links 
 
 Official website
 
 zene.hu

1961 births
Living people
People from Siófok
Hungarian pop singers
20th-century Hungarian women singers
Hungarian actresses
21st-century Hungarian women singers